Robert H. McNaught (born in Scotland in 1956) is a Scottish-Australian astronomer at the Research School of Astronomy and Astrophysics of the Australian National University (ANU). He has collaborated with David J. Asher of the Armagh Observatory.

The inner main-belt asteroid 3173 McNaught, discovered by Edward Bowell at Anderson Mesa Station in 1981, was named after him by its discoverer, following a suggestion by David Seargent.

Work 

McNaught is a prolific discoverer of asteroids and comets, described as "the world's greatest comet discoverer" and he participated in the Siding Spring Survey (SSS) using the ANU's Uppsala Southern Schmidt Telescope. He discovered the Great Comet C/2006 P1 on 7 August 2006, the brightest comet in several decades, which became easily visible to the naked eye for observers in the Southern Hemisphere. The SSS was the only active professional Near Earth Object survey in the Southern Hemisphere. The survey ended in 2013 after funding dried up.

McNaught previously worked on the Anglo-Australian Near-Earth Asteroid Survey from 1990–1996.

Other work 

McNaught worked at the University of Aston's satellite-tracking camera originally outside Evesham in 1982, thereafter at Herstmonceux and more recently at Siding Spring.  In his spare time he successfully conducts patrols for novae,
identifies images of prenovae and unusual variable stars on survey plates, measures their positions, makes astrometric observations of comets and minor planets and photometric observations of comets and novae. He also carries out extensive observational and computational work on meteors, as well as on occultations by minor planets.

Funding issues 
In October 2011, partly due to changes in the exchange rate between the Australian and US dollars, Catalina Sky Survey of NASA had to end funding McNaught's southern survey, which used to cost $110,000 per year, ending the international cooperation in July 2012. The astronomer estimated that the survey needs $180,000 annually, plus a small one-time sum to fix the observatory dome. For several months the project was temporarily funded from the ANU, but in late 2012, the ANU advised that it could no longer support the program and that funds would not be available from January 2013.

Discoveries

List of cometary discoveries 

In total, McNaught has discovered 82 comets.

Long-period 

McNaught has discovered 44 long-period comets:

 C/1987 U3 (a. k. a. 1987 XXXII, 1987b1)
 C/2005 E2
 C/2005 L2
 C/2005 L3
 C/2005 S4
 C/2006 B1
 C/2006 E1
 C/2006 K1
 C/2006 K3
 C/2006 L2
 C/2006 P1 (Great Comet of 2007)
 C/2006 Q1
 C/2007 K6
 C/2007 M1
 C/2007 P1
 C/2007 T1
 C/2007 Y2
 C/2008 A1
 C/2008 J4
 C/2009 F2
 C/2009 F4
 C/2009 F5
 C/2009 K5
 C/2009 R1
 C/2009 T1
 C/2010 J2
 C/2011 C1
 C/2011 G1
 C/2011 L2
 C/2011 L3
 C/2011 N2
 C/2011 Q2
 C/2011 R1
 C/2012 C1
 C/2012 H2
 C/2012 K6
 C/2012 T4
 C/2012 Y3
 C/2013 A1
 C/2013 E1
 C/2013 F3
 C/2013 G2
 C/2013 G7
 C/2013 J3
 C/2013 O3

Short period 

McNaught has discovered 26 short-period comets:

 191P/McNaught
 220P/McNaught
 254P/McNaught
 260P/McNaught
 278P/McNaught
 P/2004 R1 (McNaught)
 P/2005 J1 (McNaught)
 P/2005 L1 (McNaught)
 P/2005 Y2 (McNaught)
 P/2006 G1 (McNaught)
 P/2006 H1 (McNaught)
 P/2007 H1 (McNaught)
 P/2008 J3 (McNaught)
 P/2008 O2 (McNaught)
 P/2008 Y3 (McNaught)
 P/2009 Q5 (McNaught)
 P/2009 S2 (McNaught)
 P/2009 U4 (McNaught)
 P/2010 J5 (McNaught)
 P/2011 L1 (McNaught)
 P/2011 P1 (McNaught)
 P/2011 Q3 (McNaught)
 P/2012 O1 (McNaught)
 P/2012 O2 (McNaught)
 P/2012 O3 (McNaught)
 P/2013 J2 (McNaught)

Co-discoveries 

McNaught is the co-discoverer of the following comets:

 P/Catalina-McNaught (a.k.a. P/2008 S1, 2008 JK)
 P/McNaught-Hartley (a.k.a. P/1994 N2, 1994 XXXI, 1994n)
 Comet McNaught-Hartley (a.k.a. C/1999 T1)
 Comet McNaught-Tritton (a.k.a. C/1978 G2, 1978 XXVII)
 Comet McNaught-Watson (a.k.a. C/1999 S2)

Groups 

 Comets McNaught-Hughes
 C/1990 M1 (a.k.a. 1991 III, 1990g)
 130P/McNaught-Hughes (a.k.a. 1991 IX, 1991y)

 Comets McNaught-Russell
 C/1991 C3 (a.k.a. 1990 XIX, 1991g)
 C/1991 Q1 (a.k.a. 1992 XI, 1991v)
 C/1991 R1 (a.k.a. 1990 XXII, 1991w)
 C/1993 Y1 (a.k.a. 1994 XI, 1993v)
 262P/McNaught-Russell (a.k.a. 1994 XXIV, 1994u)

List of discovered minor planets 

As of 2016, Robert McNaught is credited by the Minor Planet Center with the discovery and co-discovery of 483 minor planets during 1975–2005.

List of novae
Nova Reticuli 2020

See also

References

External links 
 Siding Spring Survey

1956 births
21st-century Australian astronomers
Scottish astronomers
20th-century Australian astronomers
Discoverers of asteroids
Discoverers of comets

Living people
Scottish emigrants to Australia